The 2003 Iowa Hawkeyes football team represented the University of Iowa during the 2003 NCAA Division I-A football season. Following a 2002 season that saw the Hawkeyes finish 11–2 with a Big Ten Conference  championship, expectations for a third straight bowl game were well warranted. With four offensive starters and seven defensive starters returning from the 2002 season, the Hawkeyes looked to be a primarily defensive team going into the season.

The Hawkeyes opened the season strong, winning games over Miami, Buffalo, Iowa State and Arizona State en route to a 4–0 record. Undefeated and ranked ninth in the country, the Hawkeyes headed into East Lansing, Michigan for their Big Ten opener. Playing a Michigan State Spartans team that had just beaten Notre Dame a week earlier, the Hawkeyes turned the ball over four times and committed ten penalties in a 20–10 loss. However, with Michigan next up on the schedule, things would get no easier for the Hawkeyes. Before the game, Michigan held a 37–9–4 lead in the series between the two teams.

Down by 14 in the first quarter for the second straight game, the Hawkeyes came back to take a 30–20 lead midway through the fourth quarter. Michigan threatened the Iowa lead late, but the Hawkeyes held on for the 30–27 victory. After the victory, Iowa lost on the road to Ohio State, but followed with home wins over Illinois and Penn State. With a loss to Purdue, Iowa's record was 7–3 with two regular season games remaining. Playing against Minnesota and the Big Ten's top-ranked offense, the Hawkeyes scored 33 points before the Gophers scored a touchdown.

Following the 40–22 victory, the Hawkeyes fell behind unranked Wisconsin 21–7 during the second quarter. Needing a pass deflection in the end zone by Sean Considine with no time remaining, the Hawkeyes scored 20 straight points and escaped with a 27–21 win and a 9–3 regular season record. Playing in the 2004 Outback Bowl on January 1, 2004, the Hawkeyes won their first game in the state of Florida with a 37–17 victory over the Florida Gators. The win was also Iowa's first in the month of January since 1959.

Previous season

Behind strong performances by quarterback Brad Banks, who finished second in the Heisman voting, and the Hawkeye rushing defense, which finished fifth-best in the country, Iowa finished 11–2 and shared the Big Ten championship with undefeated Ohio State. The Hawkeyes finished with an 8–0 conference record that included wins over Penn State and Michigan. Iowa's lopsided 34–9 victory over the Wolverines in Ann Arbor was Michigan's worst home loss since 1967. Despite losses to Iowa State and Southern California, the eleven victories remained the single-season school record (since tied by the 2009 Hawkeyes). until 2015 when Iowa went 12-2

Before the season

Recruiting class
On National Signing Day, February 5, 2003, the Hawkeyes signed 22 players on football scholarships.

Preseason Rankings
Entering the season, Iowa was unranked by both major polls. However, the Hawkeyes would debut in the Coaches Poll as the 25th-ranked team before their first game against Miami University.

Schedule

Roster

Rankings

Game summaries

Miami (OH)

Source: Box Score
    
    
    
    

Future NFL star Ben Roethlisberger was intercepted four times on this opening day victory for the Hawkeyes. The win would prove more impressive as the season progressed as the Redhawks went on to win their last 13 games and were the eventual MAC conference champion.

Buffalo

Source: Box Score
    
    
    
    
    
    
    
    
    

Nathan Chandler and the Iowa offense were unstoppable in this one-sided affair. Future NFL player Sean Considine returned a fumble for a touchdown and Ramon Ochoa returned a punt 70 yards for a score as well as the Hawkeyes were clicking in every phase of the game.

Iowa State

Source: Box Score
    
    
    
    
    
    
    
    
    
    
    

Iowa was able to end the five-year winning streak by their in-state rival in this dominant win. Iowa State had the ball for almost 10 more minutes but the Hawkeyes held them to just a touchdown through the first three quarters of play. Four field goals by future NFL kicker Nate Kaeding kept Iowa in control throughout the game.

Arizona State

Source: Box Score

Michigan State

Source: Box Score

Michigan

Source: Box Score

Ohio State

Source: Box Score

Penn State

Source: Box Score

Illinois

Source: Box Score

Purdue

{{Americanfootballbox
|bg=
|bg2=
|titlestyle=; text-align:center
|state=collapsed
|title=#10 Iowa Hawkeyes (7–2) at #16 Purdue Boilermakers (7–2)
|date=November 8, 2003
|time=3:30 p.m.
|road=Iowa
|R1=0 |R2=0 |R3=7 |R4=7
|home=Purdue
|H1=7 |H2=6 |H3=14 |H4=0
|stadium=Ross–Ade Stadium, West Lafayette, Indiana
|attendance=60,058
|weather=Clear, 
|referee=Richard Honig
|TV=ESPN
|TVAnnouncers=Mark Jones, Bob Davie, and Holly Rowe
|reference=Box Score
|scoring= 
First quarter
PUR – Jerod Void 9-yard run (Ben Jones kick), 11:03. Purdue 7–0. Drive: 6 plays, 52 yards.
Second quarter
PUR – Ben Jones 44-yard field goal, 10:23. Purdue 10–0. Drive: 10 plays, 53 yards.
PUR – Ben Jones 42-yard field goal, 0:00. Purdue 13–0. Drive: 1 play, 0 yards.''Third quarterPUR – Anthony Chambers 45-yard pass from Kyle Orton (Ben Jones kick), 13:54. Purdue 20–0. Drive: 3 plays, 50 yards.
PUR – Jerod Void 1-yard run (Ben Jones kick), 7:30. Purdue 27–0. Drive: 14 plays, 63 yards.
IOWA – Nathan Chandler 3-yard run (Nate Kaeding kick), 3:05. Purdue 27–7. Drive: 9 plays, 63 yards.Fourth quarterIOWA – Jermelle Lewis 8-yard pass from Nathan Chandler (Nate Kaeding kick), 9:56. Purdue 27–14. Drive: 12 plays, 67 yards.
|stats=
Top passers
IOWA – Nathan Chandler – 16/28, 203 yards, TD, INT
PUR – Kyle Orton – 13/20, 167 yards, TD
Top rushers
IOWA – Jermelle Lewis – 7 rushes, 56 yards
PUR – Jerod Void – 34 rushes, 120 yards, 2 TD
Top receivers
IOWA – Maurice Brown – 8 receptions, 126 yards
PUR – John Standeford – 5 receptions, 61 yards
}}

MinnesotaSource: Box Score
    
    
    
    
    
    
    
    
    
    
    
    

WisconsinSource: Box Score
    
    
    
    
    
    
    
    

Outback BowlSource: Box Score
    
    
    
    
    
    
    
    
    
    

A Chris Leak-led Florida team had the initial score in Iowa's first Outback Bowl appearance but from that point the game belonged to the Hawkeyes. Iowa scored 27 unanswered points and put up over 400 yards of total offense as they controlled the ball and field position for the majority of the contest.

Postseason AwardsRobert Gallery - Winner of the Outland Trophy, presented to the nation's best interior lineman. Also received consensus first-team All-American honors.Nate Kaeding''' - First-team All-American honors at kicker, along with Nick Browne (TCU) and Drew Dunning (Washington State).

Team players in the 2004 NFL Draft

References

Iowa
Iowa Hawkeyes football seasons
ReliaQuest Bowl champion seasons
Iowa Hawkeyes football